The Internationale Hegel-Vereinigung (International Hegel Association) is a non-profit organization, founded in 1962. Its mission is to promote the study of G.W.F. Hegel's philosophy on at least two different fronts: (1) Hegel's system and its parts; and (2) Hegel's philosophical beginnings and history as it leads up to modern theory.

To accomplish these tasks the International Hegel Association organizes smaller meetings at regular intervals to discuss different topics of Hegel's philosophy, as well as an International Congress every six years, designing the most comprehensive international participation possible.

The International Hegel Association has more than 250 members worldwide. Since March, 2007, its president has been Professor Axel Honneth (Frankfurt), with offices at the Philosophical Seminar of the University of Heidelberg.

All who are occupied with Hegel's Philosophy are invited to join, particularly those who seek scientific advancement for and from this study.

The periodical publication of the International Hegel Association appeared until 1980 as a supplement of the Hegel Studien and after 1980 has been published independently by the Klett Cotta Publishing House, Stuttgart.

External links 
 Official Website

Philosophical societies in Germany
Organizations established in 1962
Georg Wilhelm Friedrich Hegel
1962 establishments in Germany